This is a list of Croatian television related events from 1969.

Events

Debuts

Television shows

Ending this year

Births
21 May - Vinko Štefanac, actor and TV host
31 July - Vedran Mlikota, actor

Deaths